Melbourne tram route 59 is operated by Yarra Trams on the Melbourne tram network from Airport West to Flinders Street station. The 14.7 kilometre route is operated out of Essendon depot with Z and B class trams.

History
Route 59 was first allocated to the line between Essendon Aerodrome and the Elizabeth Street terminus on 16 May 1943, when the Essendon line was extended to the Essendon Airport. Prior to that, route 59 had been allocated to the Williamstown Road line on the Footscray system, but numbers were never really used since the single-truck trams that ran the line didn't have route number boxes. Trams from Essendon had always terminated at Elizabeth Street, though before the Brunswick cable tram line was converted in 1936, they instead terminated on William Street. During the years where Essendon airport was Melbourne's primary airport, airlines usually transported passengers to the airport for free, the tram to Essendon Aerodrome was usually only used by airport workers. Thus when Tullamarine Airport opened in 1970, the line became of little use, and along with the fact that the line dangerously crossed the Tullamarine Freeway at grade, it was decided to truncate the line to terminate at Hawker Street, Airport West on 7 October 1976. On 22 December 1992, the line was extended by 1.2 kilometres to Airport West Shopping Centre.

The origins of Route 59 lie in separate lines. The oldest section of the line is between Flinders Street station (Stop 1) and Haymarket (Stop 9) was originally constructed as part of the Brunswick cable tram line, which opened on 1 October 1887. This line was converted to electric traction on 29 December 1936. The section of track between Abbotsford Street (near Stop 20) and Flemington Bridge station (Stop 22) was also originally part of the cable network as the North Melbourne line, which was converted to electric traction on 19 July 1925. The line between Abbotsford Street and Haymarket was constructed and opened by the Melbourne & Metropolitan Tramways Board on the same day. The section between Flemington Bridge and Keilor Road (near Stop 46) was originally opened by the North Melbourne Electric Tramway & Lighting Company on 11 October 1906. This line was extended to Gilles Street (near Stop 49) on 7 July 1923, and then again to Birdwood Street (near Stop 51) on 7 February 1937. The line to Hawker Street (Stop 57) opened on 16 May 1943 as part of the Essendon Aerodrome line. The rest of the line to Airport West opened on 22 December 1992.

Route Description
The route starts at the corner of Matthews Avenue and Rodd Road, Airport West and operates via Niddrie, Essendon, Moonee Ponds Junction, Ascot Vale, Flemington, North Melbourne and Elizabeth Street to terminate at Flinders Street station.

Operation
Routes 59 is operated out of Essendon depot with Z and B class trams.

Route map

References

External links

059
059
Elizabeth Street, Melbourne
1943 establishments in Australia
Transport in the City of Moonee Valley